Rusudan Gotsiridze ( born 8 February 1975, Tbilisi, Georgian SSR, Soviet Union) is a bishop of the Evangelical Baptist Church of Georgia and a women's rights activist. She was the first female Baptist bishop in Georgia. She has advocated against gender violence and for women's equality, and created interfaith dialogues to support religious minorities. She was also one of the first members of the religious community in Georgia to publicly support the rights of the LGBT community. She also spoke at the 6th United Nations Forum on Minority Issues about religious minorities in Georgia.

She received a 2014 International Women of Courage award.

References

External links
 Cup of Tea Theology: Bishop Rusudan Gotsiridze's talk at TEDxTbilisi

Women bishops
Living people
Women's rights activists from Georgia (country)
Feminists from Georgia (country)
1975 births
Clergy from Tbilisi
Tbilisi State University alumni
Recipients of the International Women of Courage Award